The Can Tho–Ca Mau Expressway is a planned expressway in Vietnam. It will connect the Mekong Delta cities Cần Thơ and Cà Mau.

Development
The route yet to be built has been divided into two sections, totaling  by the Ministry of Transport. The total development cost is estimated at VND47 trillion (US$2 billion). This was later reduced to VND42 trillion, as a detour passing Sóc Trăng was scrapped. Construction is planned to start by 2025 and to be completed before 2030. The Cần Thơ-Bạc Liêu section will be financed directly using public funds. The Bạc Liêu-Cà Mau section will be financed by public–private partnership.

References

Expressways in Vietnam